Laverton Halt railway station was a halt on the Honeybourne Line from Honeybourne to Cheltenham which served the hamlet of Laverton in Gloucestershire between 1905 and 1960.

The line through the site of the now-demolished station, lifted after the route's full closure in 1976, has been relaid by the Gloucestershire Warwickshire Steam Railway, with the first service to the site running on 30 March 2011. Whilst the station has not been rebuilt, a run-round was constructed at the site, which has now been removed (May 2016) ready for the extension to Broadway station.

History 
The OW&W became the West Midland Railway in 1860 and was acquired by Great Western Railway in 1883 with a view to combining it with the Birmingham to Stratford Line to create a high-speed route from the Midlands to the South West. The GWR obtained authorisation in 1899 for the construction of a double-track line between Honeybourne and Cheltenham and this was completed in stages by 1908.

Laverton Halt was opened on 14 August 1905. It was situated half a mile from the village of Laverton, from which it was separated by what is now the B4632 road. As well as Laverton, the halt served the villages of Buckland, Wormington and Stanton.

The station was a simple rail motor halt constructed of timber, much like other halts on the line. The two wooden trellis platforms had no passenger facilities beyond a small pagoda hut on each platform. A footpath from the road was constructed in 1909 at a cost of £54.

A timetable from August 1906 shows that Laverton Halt was served by seven services each way between Honeybourne and Cheltenham, with trains calling there 6 minutes after leaving Broadway in the Down direction and 7 minutes after leaving Toddington in the Up direction. The station was used by many schoolchildren who used it to travel to Cheltenham. It closed on 7 March 1960, the same day on which the local passenger service was withdrawn from the Honeybourne Line.

Present and future
The underbridge to the north of the station was removed in August 1988 to allow tall machinery to access the British Gas facility at Laverton. It was finally replaced in December 2009 by a bridge which provided the same headroom as the previous one. The cost of the new bridge was met by National Grid which now operates the gas facility.

The Heritage Gloucestershire Warwickshire Railway, which is currently in the process of reopening a major section of the Honeybourne to Cheltenham line to Broadway, ran the first train to the site of Laverton Halt on 30 March 2011. The halt has not been reinstated, although a run-round loop was installed at the site. This loop was first used on 9 March 2013, and removed by May 2016 for reuse at Broadway station.

References

Sources

 
 
 

 

Railway stations in Great Britain opened in 1905
Railway stations in Great Britain closed in 1960
Disused railway stations in Gloucestershire
Former Great Western Railway stations